Achachork (Scottish Gaelic: Achadh a' Choirce) is a small village in  the Scottish council area of the Highland. It is lies on the A855 road to the north of Portree in the east of the Isle of Skye. Robert Forrester is documented as being in Achachork in 1666.

References

Populated places in the Isle of Skye